Narasaki is a Japanese surname. Notable people with the surname include:

Karen Narasaki (born 1958), American civil rights leader and human rights activist
Ken Narasaki (born 1958),  Japanese-American playwright
, Japanese sport climber and boulderer
, also known as Oryō, Japanese woman, wife of Sakamoto Ryōma
, Japanese sport climber and boulderer
, Japanese politician

See also
Narasaki Senpakukogyo Limited, a shipbuilder in Muroran, Hokkaidō, Japan

Japanese-language surnames